The Finnish national road 69 is the 2nd class main route from Äänekoski's Hirvaskangas to Suonenjoki's Levä. The length of the road is 88 kilometers. The road as a whole is two-lane and of varying quality.

Route 

The road passes through the following municipalities, localities in brackets:
Äänekoski (Hirvaskangas)
Laukaa
Äänekoski (Kaura-aho)
Laukaa
Konnevesi (Istunmäki, Kivisalmi and Konnevesi)
Rautalampi (Pakarila and Rautalampi)
Suonenjoki
Rautalampi
Suonenjoki (Levä)

Sources

External links

Roads in Finland